The Chrysalis High is a chain of co-educational schools in Bangalore. The schools are located at:
 Varthur (Marathahalli – Sarajapur Road), started 2012, 
 Yelahanka (New Town), started 2013
 Whitefield – Kadugodi Road, started 2014 
 Bannerghatta Road, started 2015
 Banaswadi - Horamavu, Started 2016
 Whitefield – Marq, Started 2020
 Yelahanka (Bagalur Cross), started 2021

Academics 
 Chrysalis High, Varthur, follows the Indian Certificate of Secondary Education (CBSE) syllabus and has classes from Nursery to Grade X.
 Chrysalis High, Yelahanka, New Town, follows the CBSE syllabus and has classes from Nursery to Grade XII.
 Chrysalis High, Whitefield Kadugodi Road follows the CBSE syllabus.
 Chrysalis High, Bannerghatta Road follows the CBSE syllabus.
 Chrysalis High, Horamavu, follows the CBSE syllabus
 Chrysalis High, Marq, Kadugodi , follows the Indian Certificate of Secondary Education
 Chrysalis High, Yelahanka, Bagalur Cross , follows the CBSE syllabus

Campus
Chrysalis High, Marathahalli  Sarjapur Road is located in Varthur on the main road. Located on a 3 acres/1.25 lakh square feet site, the campus has a semi-Olympic size swimming pool, 100 meter skating rink, basketball court, and football ground.

Chrysalis High, Yelahanka (New Town) is spread over 2 acres and is equipped with a semi-Olympic size swimming pool, skating rink, basketball court, cricket pitch and a play area for pre-primary children.

Chrysalis High, Kadugodi, Whitefield is spread across 4 acres and has facilities like athletic track, football ground, a semi-Olympic size swimming pool, basketball court, cricket pitch and a play area for pre-primary children.

Chrysalis High, Bannerghatta Road is located just off the main road and is covered by greenery all around. Spread across 2.5 acres (1.1 lakh sq. ft.), the campus has a semi-Olympic size swimming pool, skating rink, basketball court, amphitheatre, and a play area for pre-primary children.

Chrysalis High, Horamavu, spread across an area of approximately 3 acres & has amenities like a Semi Olympic Size Swimming Pool, a Futsal Ground, Basketball Court & specially demarcated areas for Cricket, Music, Dance, Martial Arts, Gymnastics, Theatre, Yoga, Chess & Games. Chrysalis High, Horamavu is the only school in Bengaluru have a 100 metre Skating Rink for children. 

Chrysalis High, Marq, has amenities like a Semi Olympic Size Swimming Pool, a Futsal Ground, Basketball Court & demarcated areas for Cricket, Music, Dance, Martial Arts, Gymnastics, Theatre, Yoga, Chess & Games. Chrysalis High, Marq is the only school in Bengaluru to have a 100 metre Skating Rink for children. 

Chrysalis High, Yelahanka (Bagalur Cross), spread across an area of approximately 2.5 acres & has amenities like a Semi Olympic Size Swimming Pool, a Futsal Ground, Basketball Court & demarcated areas for Cricket, Music, Dance, Martial Arts, Gymnastics, Theatre, Yoga, Chess & Games. Chrysalis High, Bagalur Cross is the only school in Bengaluru to have a 100 metre Skating Rink for children.

Teaching and learning
Early Years Program (2–6 years old)
 The Early Years Program is a blend of experiential learning and a gradual building up of skills for the Foundation Years.

Foundation Years Program (Grade I–IV)
 The education is through worksheets, class activities, games and interactive circle time.

Middle Years Program (Grade V–VII)
 The children are encouraged to compare, critique, question and contribute.

Graduating Years Program (Grade VIII–X)
The curriculum aligns with the broad goals of national and international systems of education.

Most of the lessons are integrated with media tools like power point presentations, videos and interactive games

Sports
CHAMPS (Chrysalis High Amateur to Masters in Performing Arts & Sports) program starts from Grade I. Activities  like Swimming, Skating, Basketball, Gymnastics, Yoga, Contemporary Dance, Western Music, Theatre and Chess.

References

High schools and secondary schools in Bangalore